The Royal Naval College, Greenwich, was a Royal Navy training establishment between 1873 and 1998, providing courses for naval officers. It was the home of the Royal Navy's staff college, which provided advanced training for officers. The equivalent in the British Army was the Staff College, Camberley, and the equivalent in the Royal Air Force was the RAF Staff College, Bracknell.

History
The Royal Naval College, Greenwich, was founded by an Order in Council dated 16 January 1873. The establishment of its officers consisted of a President, who was always a Flag Officer; a Captain, Royal Navy; a Director of Studies; and Professors of Mathematics, Physical Science, Chemistry, Applied Mechanics, and Fortification. It was to take in officers who were already Sub-Lieutenants and to operate as "the university of the Navy".<ref>J. R. Hill, Bryan Ranft, The Oxford Illustrated History of the Royal Navy (2002), p. 269</ref> The Director of Studies, a civilian, was in charge of an Academic Board, while the Captain of the College was a naval officer who acted as chief of staff.

The Royal Naval War College, which had been established at Greenwich in November 1900 before being removed to first Devonport and then Portsmouth, transferred its activities to the college at Greenwich in 1914. During the First World War the Royal Naval College was requisitioned as a barracks and for scientific experiments. The training of officers was not resumed until 1919.

On 30 October 1939 the college began to train officers of the Women's Royal Naval Service. During the Second World War, the College increased the number of officers of both sexes trained for an expanded Navy. Its major task was the training of fighting officers, and around 35,000 men and women graduated during that period. In 1943, the beautiful Admiral's House on the north wing of King Charles Court was damaged by a direct hit from a German bomb; another bomb hit the front of the building.

The Navy's Department of Nuclear Science and Technology opened on the college premises in 1959, and JASON, the department's research and training reactor, was commissioned in the King William building in 1962.

In 1967 Queen Elizabeth II knighted Francis Chichester on the river steps of the College, honouring his achievement in circumnavigating the world as a solo yachtsman, using the old route of the clippers, becoming the first to do so. His was also the fastest such circumnavigation, taking nine months and one day.

The Royal School of Naval Architecture, which had been part of the College since 1873, transferred to University College London in 1967. The Royal Naval College continued to train women until 1976, when their courses were transferred to the Britannia Royal Naval College.

From 1983 the relocated Joint Services Defence College also occupied much of the King Charles building. With a shrinking Royal Navy, the decision was taken to close RNC Greenwich in 1998. All initial officer training is now carried out at the Britannia Royal Naval College, and the new Joint Services Command and Staff College, created in 1997, took over the staff college functions.

Buildings

The college was established in buildings designed by Sir Christopher Wren and built between 1696 and 1712, then intended to serve as the Greenwich Hospital, a home for disabled sailors. This closed in 1869, when the pensioners were transferred to other places, leaving the buildings available for a new use. The site of the former hospital had once been occupied by the medieval Palace of Placentia, or "Palace at Greenwich", begun by Humphrey, Duke of Gloucester, in 1428. 

After the Royal Navy departed in 1998 the buildings were opened to the public as the Old Royal Naval College.

PresidentsSee also :Category:Admiral presidents of the Royal Naval College, Greenwich
The President of the College was a full-time post until 1982 when it became an honorary role held by the Second Sea Lord (and from 1994 an honorary role held by the Assistant Chief of the Naval Staff). Presidents included:
Vice-Admiral Sir Astley Cooper Key (1873–1875)
Admiral Sir Edward Gennys Fanshawe (1875–1878)
Admiral Sir Charles Frederick Alexander Shadwell (1878–1881)
Admiral Sir Geoffrey Phipps Hornby (1881–1882)
Admiral William Garnham Luard (1882–1885)
Vice-Admiral Sir Thomas Brandreth (1885–1888)
Admiral Sir William Graham (1888–1891)
Admiral Sir Richard Vesey Hamilton (1891–1894)
Admiral Sir Walter James Hunt-Grubbe (1894–1897)
Admiral Sir Richard Tracey (1897–1900)
Admiral Sir Robert More-Molyneux (1900–1903)
Admiral Sir Robert Hastings Penruddock Harris (1903–1906)
Admiral Sir Arthur Dalrymple Fanshawe (1906–1908)
Admiral Sir John Durnford (1908–1911)
Admiral Sir Frederic William Fisher (1911–1914)
Vice-Admiral The Hon. Sir Alexander Edward Bethell (1914–1915)
Vice-Admiral Sir Lewis Bayly (1915–1916)
Admiral Sir Henry Bradwardine Jackson (1916–1919)
Vice-Admiral Sir William Christopher Pakenham (1919–1920)
Vice-Admiral Sir Frederick Tudor (1920–1922)
Rear-Admiral Herbert Richmond (1922–1923)
Admiral Sir George Hope (1923–1926)
Admiral Sir Richard Webb (1926–1929)
Vice-Admiral John McClintock (1929)
Vice-Admiral Sir William Henry Dudley Boyle (1929–1932)
Vice-Admiral Sir Barry Domvile (1932–1934)
Vice-Admiral Sir Ragnar Colvin (1934–1937)
Vice-Admiral Sir Sidney Bailey (1937–1938)
Vice-Admiral Sir Charles Kennedy-Purvis (1938–1940)Vacant (1940–1943)
Commodore Augustus Agar (1943–1946)
Vice-Admiral Sir Patrick Brind (1946–1948)
Vice-Admiral Geoffrey Oliver (1948–1950)
Admiral Sir Harold Kinahan (1950–1952)
Vice-Admiral Sir Aubrey Mansergh (1952–1954)
Admiral Sir William Andrewes (1954–1956)
Vice-Admiral Sir Geoffrey Barnard (1956–1958)
Rear-Admiral David Cairns, 5th Earl Cairns (1958–1961)
Rear-Admiral Sir Alexander Gordon-Lennox (1961–1962)
Rear-Admiral Morgan Morgan-Giles (1962–1964)
Vice-Admiral Sir Ian Lachlan Mackay McGeoch (1964–1965)
Rear-Admiral Patrick Bayly (1965–1967)
Vice-Admiral Sir Horace Lyddon (1967–1968)
Rear-Admiral Edward Gueritz (1968–1970)
Rear-Admiral Martin Noel Lucey (1970–1972)
Rear-Admiral Edward William Ellis (1972–1974)
Rear-Admiral Derek Willoughby Bazalgette (1974–1976)
Rear-Admiral Charles Weston (1976–1978)
Rear-Admiral Anthony John Cooke (1978–1980)
Rear-Admiral John Hildred Carlill (1980–1982)
Admiral Sir Simon Cassels (1982–1986)
Admiral Sir Richard George Alison Fitch (1986–1988)
Admiral Sir Brian Brown (1988–1991)
Admiral Sir Michael Livesay (1991–1993)
Admiral Sir Michael Henry Gordon Layard (1993–1994)
Admiral Sir John Richard Brigstocke (1994–1995)
Vice-Admiral Sir Jeremy Joe Blackham (1995–1997)

Directors of Studies
The following individuals served as Director of Studies:

Notable professors

William Burnside, Professor of Mathematics (1885–1919)
Bernard Parker Haigh, Professor of applied mechanics, known for the Haigh diagram (appointed 1913)
Peter Stanley Lyons, Director of Music (1950–1954)
John Knox Laughton, Head of Department of Meteorology and Marine Surveying (1873–1885)
Christopher Lloyd, Professor of History (1962–1967)
Bryan Ranft, Professor of History and International Affairs (1967–1977)
Arnold William Reinold, Professor of Physics (1873–1908)

Notable students

Rear-Admiral Abul Kalam Azad, Bangladeshi Naval officer and current Chairman Mongla Port Authority.
Commodore Augustus Agar  (1890–1968)
Admiral of the Fleet David Beatty, 1st Earl Beatty (1871–1936)
George Richard Bethell (1849–1919), Royal Navy officer and Conservative politician
Admiral Hugo Biermann (1916–2012), Chief of the South African Navy and the South African Defence Force
Basil Charles Barrington Brooke (1895–1983), admiral and first-class cricketer
Sir Henry Harvey Bruce (1862–1948), admiral
Admiral of the Fleet Lord Cunningham of Hyndhope (1883–1963)
Vice Admiral A. H. Asoka de Silva (1931–2006), Commander of the Navy of Sri Lanka from 1983 to 1986
Vice Admiral Henry George DeWolf (1903–2000), Canadian naval officer
John Sholto Douglas, 9th Marquess of Queensberry (1844–1900), after whom the Marquess of Queensberry Rules are named
Admiral Sir Frederic Charles Dreyer (1878–1956)
Admiral of the Fleet Prince Philip, Duke of Edinburgh (1921-2021)
Admiral Sir William Wordsworth Fisher (1875–1937)
Prince Charles, Count of Flanders, Prince-Regent of Belgium
Admiral D. Basil Gunasekara (born 1929), Commander of the Sri Lankan Navy from 1973 to 1979
Admiral Henry Perera, Commander of the Sri Lankan Navy from 1979 to 1983
Hugh Alfred Vernon Haggard (1908–1991), Royal Navy submariner
Admiral of the Fleet Lord Hill-Norton (1915–2004)
Vice Admiral Sir J. G. T. Inglis (1906–1972), Head of Naval Intelligence
Prince Abhakara Kiartivongse (1880-1923), of the Siamese royal family, a founder of modern Royal Thai Navy
Admiral of the Fleet Lord Lewin (1920–1999)
Rear-Admiral Simon Robert Lister (born 1959), Royal Navy officer, now Director, Submarines
Dudley Leigh Aman, 1st Baron Marley (1884–1952), soldier and Labour politician
Rear Admiral Sir David Martin (1933–1990), Royal Australian Navy officer and Governor of New South Wales
Vice Admiral Mark Mellett, Chief of Staff of the Irish Defence Forces
Admiral of the Fleet Earl Mountbatten of Burma (1900–1979), last Viceroy of India, First Sea Lord, Chief of the Defence Staff
Lieutenant-General Arthur Ernest Percival (1887–1966)
Marshal of the Royal Air Force Charles Portal, 1st Viscount Portal of Hungerford (1893–1971), Chief of the Air Staff
Admiral Sa Zhenbing (1859–1952), Premier of the Republic of China, Chief of the Republic of China Navy
Prince Arisugawa Takehito (1862–1913), of the Japanese imperial family, a career officer in the Imperial Japanese Navy
Rear Admiral David Watson Taylor (1864–1940), naval architect and engineer of the United States Navy
Admiral of the Fleet Tōgō Heihachirō (1848–1934), Imperial Japanese Navy
Admiral of the Fleet Lord Tovey (1885–1971)
Sir Patrick Wall (1916–1998), Royal Marines commando and Conservative politician
Josiah Wedgwood, 1st Baron Wedgwood (1872–1943), Liberal and later Labour politician

Since decommissioning
Now known as the Old Royal Naval College, the college's former buildings are open to the public and are the home of three attractions; the Painted Hall, the Chapel, and the Discover Greenwich visitor centre. The site has also been used as a film location, appearing in Sherlock Holmes (2009) and The Foreigner (2017) and as the setting for the final clash on Earth in Thor: The Dark World''.

References

See also
 Britannia Royal Naval College
 Royal Naval College of Canada
 Royal Canadian Naval College
 Royal Australian Naval College

 

 
Grade I listed buildings in the Royal Borough of Greenwich
History of the Royal Borough of Greenwich
Military history of London
Training establishments of the Royal Navy
Staff colleges
1873 establishments in England
1998 disestablishments in the United Kingdom
Educational institutions disestablished in 1998